M-phase inducer phosphatase 1 also known as dual specificity phosphatase Cdc25A is a protein that in humans is encoded by the cell division cycle 25 homolog A (CDC25A) gene.

Function 

CDC25A is a member of the CDC25 family of dual-specificity phosphatases.

Dual-specificity protein phosphatases remove phosphate groups from phosphorylated tyrosine and serine / threonine residues. They represent a subgroup of the tyrosine phosphatase family (as opposed to the serine/threonine phosphatase family).

All mammals examined to date have three homologues of the ancestral Cdc25 gene (found e.g. in the fungus species S. pombe), designated Cdc25A, Cdc25B, and Cdc25C. In contrast, some invertebrates harbour two (e.g., the Drosophila proteins String and Twine) or four (e.g., C. elegans Cdc-25.1 - Cdc-25.4) homologues.   
CDC25A is required for progression from G1 to the S phase of the cell cycle, but also plays roles in later cell cycle events.  In particular, it is stabilized in metaphase cells and is degraded upon metaphase exit akin to Cyclin B.  It is competent to activate the G1/S cyclin-dependent kinases CDK4 and CDK2 by removing inhibitory phosphate groups from adjacent tyrosine and threonine residues; it can also activate Cdc2 (Cdk1), the principal mitotic Cdk.

Involvement in cancer 

CDC25A is specifically degraded in response to DNA damage, resulting in cell cycle arrest. Thus, this degradation represents one axis of a DNA damage checkpoint, complementing induction of p53 and p21 in the inhibition of CDKs. 
CDC25A is considered an oncogene, as it can cooperate with oncogenic RAS to transform rodent fibroblasts, and it is overexpressed in tumours from a variety of tissues, including breast and head & neck tumours.  It is a target of the E2F family of transcription factors. Therefore, its overexpression is a common consequence of dysregulation of the p53-p21-Cdk axis in carcinogenesis.

Interactions 

CDC25A has been shown to interact with:

 ASK1, 
 C-Raf, 
 CHEK1, 
 CCNE1, 
 EGFR, 
 PIM1  and
 YWHAB.

References

External links

Further reading